Meyers Hill may refer to:

Meyers Hill (New York)
Meyers Hill (Oregon)